Codruț is a Romanian male given name that may refer to:

Codruț Cioranu (born 1991), Romanian footballer
Codruț Lircă (born 1989), Romanian footballer
Codruț Șereș (born 1969), Romanian engineer and politician

Romanian masculine given names